Lucas v. United States, 163 U.S. 612 (1896), was a United States Supreme Court case in which the Court held that whether a Negro freedman was a member of the Choctaw Nation was a question of fact for the jury, and his non-Indian status may not be presumed.

Background

The Choctaw Nation was one of the Five Civilized Tribes in the Indian Territory (now the eastern part of Oklahoma), and under their treaty with the United States, were allowed to have its own court system to try Indian on Indian crime. When the crime was Choctaw on Choctaw, the tribal courts would handle the trial, but if it involved a non-tribal member, the case was handled by the federal court in Fort Smith, Arkansas. Tribal members included freedmen, African-Americans who had been slaves and who had been adopted by the tribe after the Civil War.

In 1894, Eli Lucas, a member of the Choctaw Nation, was indicted in the Circuit Court for the Western District of Arkansas for the murder of Levy Kemp, an African-American. In 1895, Lucas was tried in Judge Isaac Parker's court, where witnesses said that Lucas had followed Kemp after a ball game and killed him. The defense claimed that Lucas was not truthful when he had boasted that he had killed Kemp, but that some other, unknown person had committed the murder.  Lucas was convicted of murder, and sentenced to hang.

Lucas's attorneys filed an appeal, and the Supreme Court agreed to hear the case.

Supreme Court

Justice George Shiras, Jr. delivered the opinion of the Court. Although the Court agreed that Kemp was not a Choctaw Freedman and therefore not a member of the tribe, it held that Judge Parker had erred. The trial court should not have presumed that Kemp was not a member of the tribe, the government should have been required to prove that element in order to establish jurisdiction. Shiras noted that §§ 2145-2146, Revised Statutes, stated that the federal courts did not have jurisdiction over Indian on Indian crime where the tribe had a tribal court. He also held that allowing John LeFlore testify as to what Kemp had told him was hearsay and inadmissible. The Court ordered that Lucas be retried, and reversed his conviction. Lucas was then released to the Choctaw Nation for trial.

Notes

References

External links
 

United States Supreme Court cases
Choctaw freedmen
Indian Territory
United States Supreme Court cases of the Fuller Court